Air Marshal Kodandera Cariappa 'Nanda' Cariappa is a former Air Officer in the Indian Air Force. He is the son of Field Marshal K. M. Cariappa, who was the first Commander-in-Chief of the Indian Army post-independence.

Military career
Air Marshal Cariappa was a squadron leader with No. 20 Squadron during the Indo-Pakistan War of 1965. He was shot down while carrying out air attacks during the 1965 war with Pakistan and was taken prisoner. President Ayub Khan, a former colleague of General Cariappa before the 1947 Partition, offered to release his son. But the General's terse reply was: "The POWs are all my sons, look after them well."

After repatriation K C Cariappa went on to helicopters for a short while, commanding No.111 Helicopter Unit at Hasimara during the 1971 War. He would later command No.8 Squadron in the mid 70s at Pune. He wrote a biography on his father, Field Marshal K. M. Cariappa in 2007. He presently lives in his deceased father's house Roshanara in Madikeri. He takes an active part in forest and wildlife conservation measures.

Bibliography
 Field Marshal KM Cariappa, a biography

References

Living people
Indian Air Force air marshals
Indian Air Force officers
Indian aviators
Indian prisoners of war
Pilots of the Indo-Pakistani War of 1965
Kodava people
People from Kodagu district
Recipients of the Param Vishisht Seva Medal
Recipients of the Vayu Sena Medal
Shot-down aviators
1938 births
Prisoners of war held by Pakistan
National Defence Academy (India) alumni
Defence Services Staff College alumni
Academic staff of the Defence Services Staff College
Graduates of the Royal College of Defence Studies
College of Defence Management alumni
Academic staff of the College of Air Warfare